Colquitt County Prison is located in Moultrie, Georgia in Colquitt County, Georgia. The facility houses Adult Male Felons, the capacity is 190. It was constructed in 1954 and opened in 1955. It was renovated in 1989, It is a Medium Security Prison.

References

External links
 

Buildings and structures in Colquitt County, Georgia
Prisons in Georgia (U.S. state)
1955 establishments in Georgia (U.S. state)
Buildings and structures completed in 1954